Bob Rupert (born c. 1931) is a former college basketball head coach.  He coached the Akron Zips men's basketball team from 1981 to 1984.  In four seasons, he guided the Zips to a 37-71 record.

References

1930s births
Living people
Akron Zips men's basketball coaches
Baldwin Wallace Yellow Jackets men's basketball coaches
High school basketball coaches in the United States
Ohio Northern Polar Bears men's basketball players